John Leighton may refer to:
John Leighton (MP) (15th century), MP for Bedford
John Leighton (artist) (1822–1912), artist and book cover designer
John S. Leighton (1835–1916), politician from New Brunswick
John Leighton (baseball) (1861–1956), Major League Baseball outfielder
John Leighton (footballer) (1865–1944), Nottingham Forest and England footballer
John Leighton (curator) (born 1959) British art historian, curator and museum director
John Leighton (miller), a flour miller in early Sydney; his nickname, 'Jack the Miller', is the origin of the name of the suburb of Millers Point.

See also
Leighton (disambiguation)